Telephone numbers in Myanmar are 8 to 11 digits long including the trunk prefix.

Myanmar

Format
 In Yangon, the format is 01 MMM MMMM 
 In Mandalay, the format is 02 MMM MMMM 
 In Nay Pyi Taw, the format is 067 MMM MMMM
 In Maubin, the format is 045 MMM MMMM e.g. 045307--
 There are four mobile operators in Myanmar.
 All mobile operators numbers are with 09.
 All of them have the same format except MPT.
 For Telenor, Ooredoo, and Mytel, they have 11 digits with the prefix.
 Telenor start with 0979
 Ooredoo start with 099
 Mytel start with 096

Emergency numbers

See also 
 Telecommunications in Burma

References

Burma
Myanmar-related lists